Raider(s) may refer to:

Arts and entertainment
 Paul Revere & the Raiders, an American rock band
 "Raider", a track from the 1969 album Farewell Aldebaran, by Judy Henske and Jerry Yester
 "Raiders", a track from the 1987 album Young and Free, by Rock Goddess
 Raider (novel), a 1995 novel by Susan Gates
 Western Approaches (film), a 1944 film alternatively titled The Raider
 Cylon Raider, a fighter spacecraft in various Battlestar Galactica TV series and movies
 Raiders (comics), three Marvel Comics characters
 Raiders of the Lost Ark, often referred to simply as Raiders
 Raiders!: The Story of the Greatest Fan Film Ever Made, a 2015 documentary about three fans who recreated Raiders of the Lost Ark
 Raider, a G.I. Joe: A Real American Hero toy vehicle
 Raiders, a term for bandits and highwaymen in the video game series Fallout
 Raider, a Viking warrior in the video game For Honor

Sports teams

Australia
 Adelaide Raiders, a football (soccer) club in Adelaide, South Australia
 Canberra Raiders, a National Rugby League team based in Canberra
 Toowoomba Raiders FC, a football (soccer) club from Toowoomba, Queensland
 Wodonga Raiders Football Club, a football (soccer) club in Wodonga, New South Wales

Canada
 Georgetown Raiders, a Junior "A" ice hockey team from Georgetown, Ontario
 Georgetown Raiders Sr. A, a former ice hockey team from Georgetown, Ontario
 Kingston Raiders, a junior ice hockey team in the Ontario Hockey League for the 1988–1989 season only
 Napanee Raiders, a Canadian Junior ice hockey team based in Napanee, Ontario
 Nepean Raiders, a Junior ice hockey team from Nepean, Ontario
 Ontario Raiders, a National Lacrosse League during the 1998 season
 Preston Raiders, a former (1965–1977) Canadian Junior "B" ice hockey team from  Preston (now Cambridge), Ontario
 Prince Albert Raiders, a major junior ice hockey team based in Prince Albert, Saskatchewan
 Wexford Raiders, former name (1983–2006) of the Toronto Jr. Canadiens, a Junior "A" ice hockey team from Downsview, Ontario
 Raiders, the teams of Delhi District Secondary School, Ontario

New Zealand
 Hibiscus Coast Raiders, a rugby league club based on the Hibiscus Coast
 Waitakere City Raiders, a New Zealand rugby league club based in Waitakere City from 1994 to 1996

United Kingdom
 Barrow Raiders, an English rugby league team
 Bournemouth Raiders, a former American football team
 London Raiders, a slowpitch softball club based in London, England
 Plymouth Raiders, a  British Basketball League team
 Romford Raiders, an English Premier Ice Hockey League based in Romford, London
 Telford Raiders, a rugby league club based in Telford, Shropshire, England
 Wightlink Raiders, an ice hockey team based in Ryde on the Isle of Wight, England

United States

Professional
 Las Vegas Raiders, a National Football (American football) League team based in Las Vegas, Nevada
 Northern Raiders, an American National Rugby League team based in Upstate New York
 Racine Raiders, a Mid-States Football (American football) League team based in Racine, Wisconsin
 Richmond Raiders, a former American indoor football (American football) team based in Richmond, Virginia
 Rochester Raiders, a former Continental Indoor Football (American football) League team based in Rochester, New York
 Salem Raiders, a former professional hockey team (1980–1982) based in Salem, Virginia
 Virginia Raiders, a defunct (1982–1983) minor league professional ice hockey team based in Salem, Virginia

Collegiate
 Colgate Raiders, the athletics teams of Colgate University, Hamilton, New York
 Southern Oregon Raiders, the athletic teams of Southern Oregon University, Ashland, Oregon
 Wright State Raiders, the athletics teams of Wright State University, Dayton, Ohio
 Milwaukee School of Engineering Raiders, the athletics teams from Milwaukee School of Engineering, Milwaukee, Wisconsin
 Rose State College Raiders, the athletics teams of Rose State College, Midwest City, Oklahoma
 Moorpark College Raiders, the athletics teams of Moorpark College, Moorpark, California

High school
Raiders, the teams of Plant City High School, Plant City, Florida
 Raiders, the teams of Lumberton High School (Lumberton, Texas)
 Raiders, the teams of St. Thomas Aquinas High School (Fort Lauderdale, Florida)
 Roosevelt Raiders, the teams of Eleanor Roosevelt High School (Maryland)
 Flushing Raiders, the teams of Flushing High School (Michigan)
 Portland Raiders, the teams of Portland High School (Michigan)
 Seneca Valley Raiders, the teams of Seneca Valley Senior High School
Hudson Raiders, the teams of Hudson High School, Wisconsin
Glenbard South Raiders, the teams of Glenbard South High School
Navarre Raiders, the teams of Navarre High School, Florida
Rockledge Raiders, the teams of Rockledge High School, Florida
 Archbishop Ryan Raiders, Archbishop Ryan High School, Philadelphia, Pennsylvania

Elsewhere
 Swarco Raiders Tirol, a semi-professional American football club based in Innsbruck, Austria
 Bydgoszcz Raiders, an American football team based in Bydgoszcz, Poland

Military uses
 HMS Raider, several Royal Navy ships
 Marine Raiders, an elite, special operations United States Marine Corps unit
 Merchant raider, a type of ship in naval warfare
 Northrop YC-125 Raider, a 1940s American three-engined STOL utility transport
 Sikorsky S-97 Raider, a high-speed scout and attack compound helicopter
 Northrop Grumman B-21 Raider, an American strategic bomber under development for the United States Air Force (USAF) by Northrop Grumman.

Vehicles
 Dodge Raider, a rebadged Mitsubishi Montero sold by Dodge
 Mitsubishi Raider, a rebadged Dodge Dakota sold by Mitsubishi Motors
 Suzuki Raider 150, a motorcycle
 Raider, a custom version of the Yamaha XV1900A motorcycle
 A brand of skid loader

Other uses
 Brad Rader, who has signed artwork as simply "Raider"
 Raider, the name of the Twix chocolate bar in several European countries until the 1990s
 HTC Raider 4G, a smartphone released in South Korea in 2011